Mahathanthilage Lal Kularatne (born May 5, 1949 as ලාල් කුලරත්න) [Sinhala]), popularly as Lal Kularatne, is an actor in Sri Lankan cinema, stage drama and television. Kularatne is best known for the role Liyana Mahaththaya in Ethuma teledrama and role Adiriyan in Batti teledrama.

Personal life
He completed his education from Vidyarathna University College, Horana. He passed A/L examination through commerce stream and was able to enter to the university. She is married to Sriyani Perera, who is the elder sister of popular actress Devika Mihirani. Devika is married to popular artist, late Vijaya Nandasiri. He was a teacher by profession until fired due to lengthy vacation took for a stage drama showed in abroad in 2004. The couple has two sons - Awantha, Hirantha, and two daughters - Arundathi, Sanduni.

Acting career
At the school, his teacher was popular veteran artist Hemasiri Liyanage. Kularatne started acting under his guidance along with his classmates such as Dharmasiri Bandaranayake and Douglas Siriwardena. His maiden stage drama appearance came through Rathu Hattakari directed by Lucien Bulathsinhala. Then he acted in Nariya Saha Keju, where he met his future wife.

His television drama career started with Sirisa Kothalawala's Mora Giri Gamana. His most popular television acting came through comedy roles in Batti and Ethuma. According to critics, his best teledrama acting came through Sasara Sakman, which is still did not televised.

Selected stage dramas

 Rathu Hattakari
 Thalamala Pipila
 Nariya Saha Keju
 Guru Tharuwa
 Socrates

Selected television serials

 Batti as Adiriyan
 Bhavana - Akala Rathriya
 Doratu Rakinno 
 Eheth Ehemai
 Ethuma 1, 2 as Liyana Mahaththaya
 Girikula
 Husma Saha Oxygen
 Jeewithaya Athi Thura
 Katu Imbula 
 Kolamba Italiya
 Ilandariyo 
 Mathi Nethi Daa
 Medi Sina
 Mehew Rate
 Naana Kamare
 Nagenahira Weralin Asena
 Nethu
 Nil Ahasa Oba
 Nisala Vila
 Palingu Piyapath
 Paththara Gedara
 Rahai Jeewithe
 Sansararanya Asabada
 Theertha Tharanaya
 Thunpath Ratawaka Lassana 
 Tikiri and Ungi

Beyond acting
He is a member of Sri Lanka Freedom Party political party. On 20 July 2016, he was summoned to appear before Presidential Commission of Inquiry in order to record a statement pertaining to an investigation over allegedly obtaining vehicles on lease belongs to State Engineering Corporation.

Filmography
Kularatne started his film career with Paradeesaya back in 1991, directed by Linton Semage with a minor role. His most popular cinema acting came through films Walapatala, Suhada Koka and Sikuru Hathe. 
 
 No. denotes the Number of Sri Lankan film in the Sri Lankan cinema.

Awards
He has won many awards at many local film and television award festivals. He won the award for the Best Supporting Actor in State Drama Festival for the role in Thalamala Pipila. He was under the custody for some political disputes at that moment, where his wife took the award in the festival.

State Drama Festival Awards

|-
||  ||| Thalamala Pipila || Best supporting actor ||

Unda Awards

|-
||  ||| Nagenahira Weralin || Best supporting actor ||

Sarasaviya Awards

|-
|| 2015 ||| Suhada Koka || Merit Award ||

Sumathi Awards

|-
|| 2016 ||| Theertha Tharanaya || Merit Award ||

References

External links
 The undoing of Thilanga Sumathipala

Sri Lankan male film actors
Sinhalese male actors
Living people
1949 births
Sri Lankan male stage actors